"Come With Me" (stylized as "COME WITH ME") is R&B-turned-pop singer-songwriter Kumi Koda's eighth domestic solo single. The single charted at No. 14 on Oricon and stayed on the charts for nine weeks.

Information
Come With Me is Japanese artist Koda Kumi's eighth domestic solo single and ranked No. 14 on the weekly Oricon Singles Charts, failing to perform as well as her previous single, real Emotion/1000 no Kotoba. The single charted for nine weeks. Due to the low ranking, Kumi said how she felt she was unable to perform a hit song without a famous name attached.

The b-sides on the single were English versions of "real Emotion" and "1000 no Kotoba." These versions were not the ones that were included in the North American and European releases of the Final Fantasy X-2 video game, however; the English versions found in the game were sung by Jade Villalon from the group Sweetbox. The lyrics in Kumi's original versions differ slightly from those used for Jade's version.

The single was also released as a 12" vinyl with the title track and remixes of "real Emotion" and "1000 no Kotoba."

Promotional advertisements
"Come With Me" was used in a television commercial for Choya Umeshu's "Ume jelly," which is a semi-sweet gelatinous dessert.

Music video
The music video for "Come With Me" was centered around a beach party theme in Thailand. In the video, the speaking parts were subtitled in Japanese.

While the video was released publicly during the single's initial debut, it was not available to purchase until the release of her DVD feel.... The DVD was released the same day as the single's corresponding album Feel My Mind.

Track listing
(Source)

CD

12" vinyl

Charts and sales

Alternate versions
COME WITH ME
COME WITH ME: Found on the single (2003) and corresponding album Feel My Mind (2004)
COME WITH ME [Instrumental]: Found on the single (2003)
COME WITH ME [Overhead Champion Remix]: Found on Beach Mix (2012)

References

External links
Kumi Koda official web site
Ranking – Oricon Style

Koda Kumi songs
2003 singles
2003 songs
Rhythm Zone singles
Songs written by Koda Kumi
Songs with music by H-Wonder